Iowa Lake is a lake in the U.S. states of Iowa and Minnesota.

Iowa Lake was so named from the fact it straddles the Iowa–Minnesota state line.

References

Lakes of Iowa
Lakes of Minnesota
Bodies of water of Osceola County, Iowa
Lakes of Jackson County, Minnesota
Lakes of Nobles County, Minnesota